In the Mythological Cycle of early Irish literature, the four treasures (or jewels) of the Tuatha Dé Danann are four magical items which the mythological Tuatha Dé Danann are supposed to have brought with them from the four island cities Murias, Falias, Gorias and Findias when they arrived in Ireland.

Sources
Together the four treasures form the subject of at least three Middle Irish texts:
an anecdote in an interpolated recension of the legendary Lebor Gabála Érenn ("The Book of the Taking of Ireland"), here LG,
the introduction, interpolated from Lebor Gabála, of Cath Maige Tuired ("The Second Battle of Mag Tuired"), here CMT, and
"The Four Jewels", a later, short text in the Yellow Book of Lecan, consisting of a prose introduction and a poem.
In the 17th century, Geoffrey Keating drew on a version of the former for his Foras Feasa ar Éirinn.

Summary
The first recension of Lebor Gabála describes the Tuatha Dé Danann as having resided in "the northern islands of the world", where they were instructed in the magic arts, before finally moving in dark clouds to Connaught in Ireland. It mentions only the Lia Fáil as having been imported from across the sea.

One of the recensions of Lebor Gabála, Cath Maige Tuired and a separate text elaborate on these events. CMT and LG tell that there were four cities located on the northern islands of the world (i n-insib tūascertachaib in domain), called Falias, Gorias, Findias and Murias. "The Four Jewels" also refers to the cities, but appears to locate them at Lochlann and contends that the Tuatha Dé crossed the seas in their fleet rather than in a mist. The Tuatha Dé Danann—described as the offspring of Béothach son of Iarbonel—landed here to be instructed in the magic arts, embracing druidry (druidecht), knowledge (fis), prophecy (fáitsine) and skill in magic (amainsecht). Each island is said to have had its poet (fili) who was skilled in occult arts.

When the Tuatha Dé migrated to Ireland, they are said to have brought four magical instruments from these cities:

A. C. L. Brown and R. S. Loomis equate Lug's spear with the Lúin of Celtchar, which in Togail Bruidne Dá Derga is said to have been discovered in the Battle of Mag Tuired. There is however no sign of a literary tradition which connects the two weapons. A different spear belonging to Lug is the so-called spear of Assal in Oidheadh Chloinne Tuireann. It was brought back to Lug by the sons of Tuireann in atonement for their killing of Cian.

See also
Thirteen Treasures of the Island of Britain

Notes

Sources
Lebor Gabála Érenn, ed. and tr. R.A.S. Macalister. Lebor Gabála Érenn: The Book of the Taking of Ireland. Part IV. Irish Texts Society 41. London, 1941. Section VII, § 304–5. Portion of the text reproduced here.
Cath Maige Tuired, ed. and tr. Elizabeth A. Gray, Cath Maige Tuired: The Second Battle of Mag Tuired. Irish Texts Society 52. Kildare, 1982.
"The Four jewels", Middle Irish poem with prose introduction in the Yellow Book of Lecan, ed. and tr. Vernam Hull. "The four jewels of the Tuatha Dé Danann." Zeitschrift für celtische Philologie 18 (1930): 73–89. Edition available from CELT. Translation available here (Mary Jones) and here (proof-corrected). Hull's article includes commentary.
Geoffrey Keating,  Foras feasa ar Éirinn. The History of Ireland by Geoffrey Keating, ed. and tr. D. Comyn and P.S. Dinneen, Foras Feasa ar Éirinn le Seathrún Céitinn. 4 vols: vols 1–3. Irish Texts Society 4, 8 and 9. London: David Nutt, 1902–1914.

Further reading
 
Dumézil, Georges. Jupiter, Mars, Quirinus. Essai sur la conception indo-européenne de la société et sur les origines de Rome. Gallimard, Paris, 1941. Esp. p. 228.

Tuatha Dé Danann
4 Four Treasures
Mythological cycle
Mythological objects
Mythological swords
Fictional swords
Legendary treasures

fr:Épée de Nuada
hu:Nuada kardja
ja:クラウ・ソラス